The Church of All Saints, Hassop, Derbyshire is a Roman Catholic parish church.  Built in 1816–17, the architect was Joseph Ireland.  It is a Grade I listed building.

History
Francis Eyre of Hassop Hall built the original chapel between 1816-17. The Eyres had lived at Hassop since the 15th century and were prominent local Catholics. The architect, Joseph Ireland, worked for many Catholic families in the Midlands but few of his buildings survive.

Description
The style of the building is Neoclassical, with the appearance of a Greek Temple. The building is constructed of sandstone, with a roof of Welsh slate. The main, western, front has a Tuscan Doric portico. The eastern front is windowless, with Tuscan pilasters.

The interior was remodelled in 1995 and features a coffered ceiling and a "rather wild Baroque altar and reredos".

See also
Grade I listed churches in Derbyshire
Grade I listed buildings in Derbyshire
Listed buildings in Hassop

Notes

References
 

Grade I listed churches in Derbyshire
Roman Catholic churches in Derbyshire
Grade I listed Roman Catholic churches in England
Roman Catholic churches completed in 1818
19th-century Roman Catholic church buildings in the United Kingdom
Roman Catholic Diocese of Nottingham
Neoclassical church buildings in England